Maumee may refer to:

Places:
 Maumee Township, Allen County, Indiana
 Maumee, Indiana, an unincorporated community in Salt Creek Township
 Maumee, Ohio, a city in Lucas County
 Maumee River, a river in northwestern Ohio and northeastern Indiana, United States
 Maumee Bay, Ohio, on Lake Erie
 Maumee State Forest, Ohio
 Maumee Bight, Ross Island, Antarctica
 Maumee Ice Piedmont, Marie Byrd Land, Antarctica
 Maumee Vallis, an ancient river valley on Mars
 Maumee Swamp, a swamp in Herkimer County, New York

Geology:
 Lake Maumee, the ancestor of present-day Lake Erie
 Maumee Torrent, the catastrophic draining of Glacial Lake Maumee

Ships:
USS Maumee, four US Navy ships
MV Maumee, a self-unloading motor vessel on the Great Lakes owned by the Lower Lakes Corporation, originally built in 1923 under the name MV Calcite II
The Maumee class of U.S. Navy oilers

Other uses:
Toledo Maumees, a 19th-century baseball team based in Toledo, Ohio

See also
Miami people